The 1997 Challenge Bell was a tennis tournament played on indoor carpet courts at the Club Avantage Multi-Sports in Quebec City in Canada that was part of Tier III of the 1998 WTA Tour. It was the 6th edition of the Challenge Bell, and was held from October 26 through November 1, 1998. Tara Snyder won the singles title.

Champions

Singles

 Tara Snyder def.  Chanda Rubin, 4–6, 6–4, 7–6
It was Snyder's only title of the year and the 1st of her career.

Doubles

 Lori McNeil /  Kimberly Po def.  Chanda Rubin /  Sandrine Testud, 6–7, 7–5, 6–4
It was McNeil's only title of the year and the 41st of her career. It was Po's only title of the year and the 1st of her career.

External links
Official website

Challenge Bell
Tournoi de Québec
Challenge Bell
1990s in Quebec City